Evan Kenneth Craft (born April 8, 1991), is an American Contemporary worship music singer. Evan has recorded albums in Spanish and English. His 2012 release, Yo Soy Segundo, ranked high on the Billboard charts, reaching number one on the Christian Latin Albums chart in the United States, number 10 on the Latin Pop Albums chart and number 30 on the Billboard Top Latin Albums chart. Craft has been nominated for multiple awards.

Biography 
Evan Craft was born in 1991 in Conejo Valley, California. Craft began to play the guitar at the age of 12 and there he began to write songs. Craft expanded his linguistic studies at university, attending schools in Spain and Costa Rica.

Musical career 
Evan Craft began writing songs during high school. Evan has released several albums and EPs. His first album in Spanish, Craft joined other musicians such as Sean and Ryan Cook and Nico Aranda, to travel through different countries delivering evangelical messages through their performances in many Spanish churches, schools and orphanages.

Craft in 2012 released his first full-length studio album called Giants, under the DREAM Records label.

In 2012 he released the album Yo Soy Segundo, under the Dream Records label and was distributed through Universal, the album debuted in the United States at number one on the chart Latin Christian Albums, at number 10 on the Latin Pop Albums chart and number 30 on Top Latin Albums chart by Billboard. In his other musical productions Evan Craft recorded songs with Danilo Montero, Ingrid Rosario, Seth Condrey, among others. Yo Soy Segundo reached several stations Christian Radio and on download lists.

He followed it up with the album Jóvenes Somos in 2014.

In 2015 released the album Principio Y Fin, under the Essancy Music label. The album has the participation of the American Carlos PenaVega in the main song, it also has other collaborations by other artists such as Danilo Montero, Ingrid Rosario, Seth Condrey and "Un Corazón" Lluvia Richards. 
In December 2019 Jordan Feliz feat. Evan Craft released the bilingual single "Faith (Fe)". Craft was nominated for the  2016 GMA Dove Award Spanish Language Album of the Year for Principio y Fin. In 2017, Evan released the album Impulso, working together with artists such as Marcos Witt, Alex Campos, Marcela Gándara, Funky, Redimi2, among others. Craft was nominated for 2018 GMA Dove Award Spanish Language Album of the Year for Impulso (2017).

Evan Craft in 2021 released his fourth album in Spanish and third album in English called Desesperado, which was a hit with songs like: Tu Señor, Desesperado, among other songs. "Be Alright". The album in Spanish Desesperado debuted at number 45 on Billboards Top Christian Albums chart. The single from the album, features Danny Gokey and Redimi2, the song debuted at number 3 on the Hot Christian Songs chart, debuted at number three on the chart Christian Digital Song Sales, debuted at number 2 on the Billboard Hot Christian Songs chart debuted at number 5 on the Christian Airplay chart, debuted at number 5 on the Christian AC chart, and also debuted at number 9 on the Billboard Christian Streaming Songs chart. Craft won the 2021 GMA Dove Award for Spanish Language Album of the Year for Desesperado (2021).

Personal life 
On March 2, 2021, Evan Craft published a video on his YouTube channel in which he is seen with a ring proposing to his girlfriend Rachel. Evan shared the news that he had married his girlfriend Rachel Jacoby on September 17, 2021.

Discography

Albums 
 Spotlight (2010)
 Giants (2012)  
 Yo Soy Segundo (2012)
 Jóvenes Somos (2014)
 Sesión Orgánica: Parte 1 (2015)
 Principio y Fin (2015)
 Sesión Orgánica: Parte 2 (2016)
 Impulso (2017)
 Desesperado (2021)
 Tierra Santa (2021)
 Holy Ground (2021)
 Mercy in a Manger (2022)

Extended plays 
 Mi Casa Es Tu Casa (Acústico) (2019)
 Desesperado Reborn (2021)

Awards and nominations

GMA Dove Awards 

!
|-
| 2016
| Principio y Fin
| Spanish Language Album of the Year
| 
| 
|-
| rowspan="2" | 2018
| "Lléname"
| Spanish Language Recorded Song of the Year
|  
| rowspan="2" | 
|-
| Impulso
| Spanish Language Album of the Year
| 
|-
| 2019
| "Mi Casa Es Tu Casa"
| Spanish Language Recorded Song of the Year
| 
| 
|-
| 2021
| Desesperado
| Spanish Language Album of the Year
| 
| 
|-
| 2022
| "Be Alright"
| Song of the Year
| 
| 
|-
|}

References 

Living people
Christian music songwriters
Performers of contemporary worship music
American performers of Christian music
American male singer-songwriters
Spanish-language singers of the United States
1991 births
Singer-songwriters from California